|}

The An Riocht Chase is a Grade 3 National Hunt steeplechase in Ireland. It is run at Killarney in May, over a distance of about 2 miles and 4½ furlongs (4,073 metres) and during its running there are 14 fences to be jumped.

The race was first run at Grade 3 level in 2016 having previously been an ungraded conditions race.  An Riocht is Gaelic for The Kingdom.

Records
Most successful horse (2 wins):
 Peregrine Run – 2019, 2020

Most successful jockey (2 wins):
 Kevin Sexton -  Peregrine Run (2019, 2020) 
 Jack Kennedy - Clarcam (2016), Samcro (2021)

Most successful trainer (2 wins): 
 Peter Fahey – Peregrine Run (2019, 2020) 
 Willie Mullins -  Ballycasey (2017), Easy Game (2022)

Winners

See also
 Horse racing in Ireland
 List of Irish National Hunt races

References

Racing Post:

National Hunt races in Ireland
National Hunt chases
Killarney Racecourse